MidAmerica Industrial Park (MAIP) is Oklahoma's largest industrial park, located in Pryor Creek, Oklahoma, United States. In 2020, over 80 firms were located within the industrial park including operations of seven Fortune 500 companies, such as Google, DuPont and Nordam.
The park was founded in 1960, when the US Federal Government sold most of the former Oklahoma Ordnance Works to a public trust, the Oklahoma Ordnance Works Authority.

Tenants
Urgent Care of Green Country (UCGC) opened their Pryor/MidAmerica clinic at MidAmerica Industrial Park on January 19, 2009. Independently owned, UCGC was founded in 2002 by Dr. Stephen R. Kovacs and Dr. S. Addison Beeson. The  facility includes a reception area, doctor's office, eight exam/treatment rooms, EMR (Electronic Medical Records), in-house x-ray, orthopedics and lab services. The clinic will treat employees from MidAmerica industries and area businesses that require occupational health services such as: in-depth diagnostic and treatment for most occupational injuries; drug testing; employee physicals; and, sports physicals. Additionally, UCGC offers “walk-in treatment” with no appointment necessary for the general public from throughout Mayes County.

Tulsa Life Flight, a helicopter ambulance service formerly based solely at Saint Francis Hospital in Tulsa, will open a second base of operations at MidAmerica Industrial Park's airport.  Tulsa Life Flight was established in 1979. It was the thirteenth helicopter air ambulance to be established in the US and the first in Oklahoma. To date, Tulsa Life Flight has completed more than 42,200 accident free flights. The aircraft are owned and operated by Air Methods Corporation, the largest air ambulance corporation in the world. The firm contracts with Saint Francis Hospital to provide aircraft, pilots and mechanics.

In 2022, following a significant order from Zeeba, a California fleet management company, electric vehicle manufacturer Canoo announced construction of a vehicle battery production facility at MAIP.  This followed its earlier announcement of a vehicle production plant at MAIP capable of producing 300,000 cars per year.

MidAmerica publishes a quarterly newsletter called MidPoint to share "news, views and other information" about the park and the industries that it serves. A complimentary subscription is available to individuals who are involved in site-selection decision making for their respective companies.

In February 2020, MAIP opened The Center of Excellence in the refurbished space of the former OSU Institute of Technology Training Center, which closed in December 2018.  The  Center is consortium-based and dedicated to technology, training and career opportunities.

MidAmerica Industrial Park Airport
MAIP has its own airfield.  The MidAmerica Industrial Park Airport features a single  asphalt runway which was refurbished in 2016.

Leadership
In November 2012, Oklahoma Governor Mary Fallin appointed David Stewart as the chief administrative officer of the Oklahoma Ordnance Works Authority (OOWA). He succeeded Sanders Mitchell, who had headed the authority for 35 years before retiring. Stewart was formerly president and chief executive officer (CEO) of Cherokee Nation Businesses LLC and the wholly owned parent/holding company of the Cherokee Nation, which is charged with the economic development and business diversification across the Cherokee Nation's business entities. Sanders Mitchell had been hired by OOWA in 1977 to serve as general manager of the industrial park. He was promoted to the position of general manager for OOWA in 1990, following the death of the original chief administrative office, board member and founder of the Mid-America Industrial Park, Gene R. Redden, who served in this capacity from its inception in 1961 until his death in 1990.

Notes

References

External links
 MidAmerica Industrial Park
 Overview
 Industry Directory

Industrial parks in the United States
Economy of Oklahoma
Buildings and structures in Mayes County, Oklahoma